Auchtertyre (Scottish Gaelic: Uachdar Thìre, "Upper Land") is a village, lying half a mile from the north shore of Loch Alsh near Kyle of Lochalsh, in the Highlands and is in the Scottish council area of the Highland Council.

Auchtertyre Primary School serves the surrounding area, including Achmore, Balmacara and Dornie.

References

Populated places in Lochalsh